Vallensbæk Landsby is a village on Zealand, located in Vallensbæk Municipality in the Capital Region of Denmark.

History
Vallensbæk Church was built in the 1100s.

References 

Vallensbæk Municipality
Cities and towns in the Capital Region of Denmark
Villages in Denmark